Fiji Football Cup more commonly known as the FIji Fact  is an annual knockout football competition in men's domestic Fijian football. It is organized by the Fiji Football Association.

History 
In 1991, the inaugural FF Cup took place in Ba. The inaugural season was won by Ba who defeated Labasa by 1-0.

FF Cup Champions

Most successful teams

Awards 
 2015
 Golden Boot: Peni Finau, 5 Goals 
 Player of the Tournament: Taniela Waqa
 2017
 Golden Boot: Ravinesh Karan Singh, 4 Goals 
 Player of the Tournament: Samuela Kautoga
 2022 Fair Play Team of the Tournament Award:  Nadi FC Golden Glove Award: Beniamino Mateinaqara (Suva FC)   Golden Boot Award: Sairusi Nalaubu (5)   Player of the Tournament Award: Shahil Dave (Suva FC)

2013 Vodafone Fiji Football Association Cup

First Round

Day One

External links 
 Fiji FACT Roll of Honour
 The Rec.Sport.Soccer Statistics Foundation.

Football competitions in Fiji
Soccer